Rolf Iseli is a Swiss curler and curling coach.

At the national level, he is a four-time Swiss men's champion curler (1995, 1998, 2010, 2011).

Teams

Record as a coach of national teams

References

External links

Living people
Swiss male curlers
Swiss curling champions
Swiss curling coaches
Year of birth missing (living people)
Place of birth missing (living people)